Sutrapur is a Thana of Dhaka District in the Division of Dhaka, Bangladesh.

Geography
It has 49,286 households and total area 4.38 km2.

Demographics
At the 1991 Bangladesh census, Sutrapur had a population of 307,483, of whom 186,619 were aged 18 or older. Males constituted 57.33% of the population, and females 42.67%. Sutrapur had an average literacy rate of 63.3% (7+ years), twice as high as the national average of 32.4%.

Points of interest
 Bhajahari Lodge is an early 20th century building on the Department of Archaeology's list of protected monuments.

Education
Sutrapur is home to some of the old and renowned schools, like Government Shaheed Suhrawardy College, St Gregory's High School, Dhaka Collegiate School, Muslim Government High School, and Pogose School, Dhaka.

See also
 Upazilas of Bangladesh
 Districts of Bangladesh
 Divisions of Bangladesh

References

Old Dhaka
Thanas of Dhaka